The 2020–21 Monmouth Hawks men's basketball team represented Monmouth University in the 2020–21 NCAA Division I men's basketball season. The Hawks, led by tenth-year head coach King Rice, played their home games at OceanFirst Bank Center in West Long Branch, New Jersey as members of the Metro Atlantic Athletic Conference. They finished the season 12–8, 12–6 in MAAC play to finish in a tie for first place. As the No. 2 seed in the MAAC tournament, they lost in the quarterfinals to No. 7 seed Fairfield 60–79.

Previous season
The Hawks finished the 2019–20 season 18–13 overall, 12–8 in MAAC play to finish in a tie for third place. Before they could face #5 seeded Quinnipiac in the MAAC tournament quarterfinals, all postseason tournaments were cancelled amid the COVID-19 pandemic.

Roster

Schedule and results 

|-
!colspan=12 style=| Non-conference regular season

|-
!colspan=12 style=| MAAC regular season

|-
!colspan=12 style=| MAAC tournament
|-

|-

Source

References

Monmouth Hawks men's basketball seasons
Monmouth Hawks
Monmouth Hawks men's basketball
Monmouth Hawks men's basketball